Manuel de la Cruz (1750–1792) was a Spanish painter.  He was born and died in Madrid. He distinguished himself by his pictures in the cathedral of Carthagena and in the monastery of San Francisco el Grande at Madrid. In the Gallery of the latter city there is a painting by him of The Annual Fair at Madrid. He also etched a few plates of heads of strongly marked character.

References
 

1750 births
1792 deaths
18th-century Spanish painters
18th-century Spanish male artists
Spanish male painters
Artists from Madrid